Burnside Plantation House is a historic plantation house located near Williamsboro, Vance County, North Carolina.  It was built about 1800 and remodeled before 1824. It is a two-story, five bay, Federal style frame dwelling.  It is sheathed weatherboard and a gable roof.  Each gable end has a pair of brick chimneys with stepped weatherings.  The property includes a smokehouse dated to about 1760.  During the American Civil War, it was the residence of Thomas Hardy, whose daughter Pinckney Hardy, became the mother of General Douglas MacArthur.

It was listed on the National Register of Historic Places in 1971.

References

External links

Historic American Buildings Survey in North Carolina
Plantation houses in North Carolina
Houses on the National Register of Historic Places in North Carolina
Federal architecture in North Carolina
Houses completed in the 19th century
Houses in Vance County, North Carolina
National Register of Historic Places in Vance County, North Carolina